Actinoptera formosana is a species of tephritid or fruit flies in the genus Actinoptera of the family Tephritidae.

Distribution
India, Sri Lanka, Nepal, Myanmar, China, Taiwan, Philippines.

References

Tephritinae
Insects described in 1933
Diptera of Asia